Stefan Krah is a German violinist who cracked one of the last three remaining World War II enigma codes on 4 March 2006.

References

External links
 Stefan Krah's M4 Project and the Story of U-264

German violinists
German male violinists
Recreational cryptographers
Living people
21st-century violinists
21st-century German male musicians
Year of birth missing (living people)